Ian Kenneth Taylor (born 4 June 1968) is an English former professional footballer and sports television pundit.

He played as a midfielder and best known for his time at Aston Villa. A midfielder, he had a fifteen-year career in the Football League and Premier League, scoring 103 goals in 577 league and cup competitions. He made the move from non-league Moor Green to Port Vale in 1992. With Vale he lifted the Football League Trophy in 1993. His impressive performances earned him a place on the Second Division PFA Team of the Year in 1992–93 & 1993–94, as well as the club's Player of the Year award in 1993. He made a million pound move to Sheffield Wednesday in June 1994, and he was sold on for another million to Aston Villa later in the year. He lifted the League Cup and reached the FA Cup final with the club he had supported as a boy. In 2003, he signed with Derby County, helping the club to the Championship play-offs before signing with Northampton Town in June 2005. He helped the club to win promotion out of League Two in 2005–06, before he announced his retirement in April 2007.

Playing career

Moor Green to Port Vale
Taylor played for Municipal Officials and Shirley Crusaders, and was a forklift trucker driver when started his career with Southern League Premier Division side Moor Green. He got a move into the Football League in May 1992 after scoring in Green's Midland Floodlit Cup final victory, when Port Vale paid the club £15,000 (this figure later rose to £25,000 due to instalments based on appearances). He was spotted playing for Moor Green against Burton Albion by Ray Williams, who had actually intended to scout Burton player Darren Roberts. Rudge saw him as a potential replacement for Robbie Earle. His debut came on 7 August 1992, in a 5–0 win over De Graafschap in the TNT Tournament. He became a regular in the side and in 1992–93 scored 15 goals to become the club's top scorer and earn himself the Player of the Year award, as well as a place on the PFA Second Division team. He was once again selected in the PFA's divisional team of the season for the 1993–94 season. He also lifted the Football League Trophy, scoring a "stunning overhead goal" against Fulham in the opening round, and going on to play in the final as Vale beat Stockport County 2–1 at Wembley Stadium. He would later state: "John Rudge... gave me the opportunity to play professional football. He put me in the team and had faith in me. That was the bedrock of my career".

Sheffield Wednesday
In June 1994, Taylor signed with Premier League club Sheffield Wednesday. The next month a tribunal decided upon a £1 million fee, plus £100,000 for an England appearance and £25,000 for every ten goals up to a maximum of fifty goals as well as 15% of the profit of any future sale. As it happened he was shifted on to Brian Little's Aston Villa in December that year for £1 million plus Guy Whittingham. The "profit" for Wednesday was therefore Whittingham himself, meaning all the would-be bonuses were an irrelevance. Taylor played just eighteen games for Wednesday, but did score a goal in the pre-season Steel City Cup.

Aston Villa
A lifelong supporter of the "Villans", as a child he used to stand on the Holte End at Villa Park. This fact, combined with his utterly committed displays and knack of scoring crucial goals, quickly established him as a fans' favourite. Villa narrowly stayed in the Premier League in 1994–95 after finishing three points and one place above relegated Crystal Palace. Villa finished fourth in 1995–96, and Taylor scored in wins over Manchester United, Wimbledon, Leeds United, and Southampton. He also played, and scored, in the Aston Villa side that won the 1996 League Cup final 3–0 against Leeds.

He played 36 domestic games in 1996–97, scoring in wins over Leeds, Wimbledon, and Liverpool. He scored 9 goals in 44 games in 1997–98, and maintained his first team place under new manager John Gregory. Taylor also netted important goals in Villa's 1997–1998 UEFA Cup run, when they would eventually be knocked out by Atlético Madrid on away goals at the quarter-final stage.

He scored four times in 38 games in 1998–99, and again Villa won all games in which he found the net, including a 2–1 victory at Coventry City in which Taylor scored both Villa's goals. He was prolific in 1999–2000, scoring ten goals in 42 games, helping Villa to reach the 2000 FA Cup Final, where they lost out 1–0 to Chelsea. Taylor hit five goals in 35 games in 2000–01, including both goals in a 2–0 win over Tottenham Hotspur. However, he was restricted to just eighteen appearances in 2001–02, as manager John Gregory was replaced by Graham Taylor in January. After only nineteen appearances in 2002–03, he was released by Taylor at the end of the campaign.

Derby County
Taylor joined First Division side Derby County, where he was made captain. He was the club's top-scorer in 2003–04 with twelve goals, as Derby avoided relegation by a single point. He played 44 games in 2004–05, as Derby reached the Championship play-offs, where they were defeated by Preston North End in the semi-finals. Taylor was released in May 2005.

Northampton Town
In June 2005 he signed with League Two outfit Northampton Town. The "Cobblers" won promotion in 2005–06 as League Two runners-up, with Taylor making 38 appearances. For his performances he was named on the PFA Team of the Year. Northampton retained their League One status in 2006–07, as Taylor played another 36 games. Taylor announced that the game at home to Huddersfield Town on 27 April would be the last of his career before retiring as a professional player. A small number of Aston Villa fans attended this match. At Villa's away match against Manchester City the day after Taylor's final game, the travelling Villa fans sang "There's only one Ian Taylor".

International career
Taylor was born in Birmingham, England and is of Barbadian descent through his mother. In May 2004, he was considered by Barbados manager Kenville Layne for a call-up to the 2006 FIFA World Cup qualifying double-header against Saint Kitts and Nevis in June 2004. Taylor revealed that he turned down a similar approach from the nation five years previous, as he wanted to play for England.

Post-retirement
Taylor is now an occasional football pundit for the Aston Villa website's Villa TV, and can regularly be seen at Aston Villa games. During the 2007–08 season, he has been given a regular column as the final feature in Aston Villa's match programme, titled 'Tayl End'. Still held in very high esteem by Villa fans, he maintained his cult status in October 2005, when instead of sitting with the directors and VIPs for the Second City derby against Birmingham City at St Andrew's, he was amongst the travelling Aston Villa contingent; Taylor did the same thing again in Villa's game against Blues on 11 November 2007. He played for Villa in the 2007 Premier League All Stars charity tournament. In August 2008 he became a match day summariser covering matches involving Derby County for BBC Radio Derby during the 2008–09 season.

In February 2011, Taylor rejoined Aston Villa after being appointed club ambassador. In 2012, Taylor created his own brand of headphones and speakers called iT7 Audio, which has been worn by a host of celebrities and sportspeople supporting the brand.

Career statistics
Source:

Honours
Moor Green
Midland Floodlit Cup: 1992

Port Vale
Football League Trophy: 1992–93

Aston Villa
FA Cup runner-up: 1999–2000
League Cup: 1995–96

Northampton Town
League Two second-place promotion: 2005–06

Individual
Team of the Year: 1992–93 (Second Division), 1993–94 (Second Division), 2005–06 (League Two)
Port Vale Player of the Year: 1992–93

References

External links
 

1968 births
Living people
Footballers from Birmingham, West Midlands
Black British sportsmen
English footballers
English sportspeople of Barbadian descent
Association football midfielders
Moor Green F.C. players
Port Vale F.C. players
Sheffield Wednesday F.C. players
Aston Villa F.C. players
Derby County F.C. players
Northampton Town F.C. players
Southern Football League players
English Football League players
Premier League players
FA Cup Final players